The Joseph Bergman House is a house located in northwest Portland, Oregon, listed on the National Register of Historic Places.

See also
 National Register of Historic Places listings in Northwest Portland, Oregon

References

1885 establishments in Oregon
Houses completed in 1885
Houses on the National Register of Historic Places in Portland, Oregon
Individually listed contributing properties to historic districts on the National Register in Oregon
Italianate architecture in Oregon
Northwest Portland, Oregon
Portland Historic Landmarks